Nenad Bajić Bajone (Belgrade, FNRY, March 31, 1958) is a Serbian pop, rock and jazz composer and songwriter and singer.  He graduated in dentistry at the University of Belgrade.  He became the youngest member of the Association of Yugoslav Composers, as well as the Association of Jazz, Pop and Rock Musicians in 1980.  He held his first solo concert in the Great Hall of the Sava Center in Belgrade, 1993, and since 1995, every spring, also in the Great Hall of the Sava Center, he has held concerts for the youngest.  He held a farewell concert on October 20, 1999.  During 2000, he was the screenwriter and host of his own show program called "Bajonexpress", which was broadcast on the then prestigious BK Television.  His daughter Mina also led the program together with him.  He recorded a total of 50 one-hour shows, in which talented children competed in singing, playing and acting.  He retired from the music scene in 2001.

Discography
Atak na batak (1983)
Vreme ljubavi (1991)
Sad & nekad (1992)
Uprkos vremenu (1993)
Raduj se (1995)
B-98 (1998)

References: YouTube: bajone (original version)

1958 births
Living people
Musicians from Belgrade
Serbian jazz musicians
Serbian rock singers
Serbian pop singers
20th-century Serbian male singers
Yugoslav male singers